Kemal Okyay (born 25 February 1985) is a Turkish former footballer. He was a left winger. He studied at Erciyes University.

He has played for national under-20 football team at 5 times.

Honours 
 Kayserispor
Turkish Cup (1): 2008

References

External links
 

1985 births
People from Kayseri
Living people
Turkish footballers
Turkey youth international footballers
Association football wingers
Kayserispor footballers
Kayseri Erciyesspor footballers
Manisaspor footballers
Nazilli Belediyespor footballers
TKİ Tavşanlı Linyitspor footballers
Erciyes University alumni
Süper Lig players
TFF First League players
TFF Second League players